Operation Diamond Head was an operation conducted by the 3rd Brigade, 25th Infantry Division in Tây Ninh Province, lasting from 11 July to 31 October 1967.

Prelude
In May 1967, U.S. intelligence located a People's Army of Vietnam (PAVN) supply base in the Angel's Wing area of Cambodia's Svay Rieng Province and learned that a two battalion attack would be made from this sanctuary into Tây Ninh Province in July.

Operation
The operation commenced on 11 July with the 2nd Battalion, 12th Infantry Regiment and the 3rd Battalion, 2nd Infantry Regiment and 8 South Vietnamese Regional Force companies conducting sweeps between the Vàm Cỏ Đông River and the Cambodian border.

On 14 July, South Vietnamese agents reported that the PAVN planned to attack Tây Ninh city and that night PAVN forces attacked positions between Tây Ninh and Dầu Tiếng District. The border sweeps were immediately cancelled and on 15 July the 2 Battalions, reinforced by the 2/22nd Infantry (Mechanized) moved to the scene of the attacks but the PAVN had fled. On 18 July a U.S. patrol engaged and killed several members of the PAVN 165th Regiment.

The 2 Battalion attack never eventuated and the operation continued with only sporadic contact resulting in 61 PAVN and 31 U.S. killed by the end of August.

On the night of 2 September, a PAVN force attacked a U.S. company's night defensive position destroying 2 M113s with Rocket-propelled grenades. On 4 September the same company engaged a PAVN force near Black Virgin Mountain losing 4 killed.

In late September, the 2nd Battalion, 34th Armor Regiment joined the operation and were tasked with defending Tây Ninh Combat Base. The other Battalions swept the Michelin Rubber Plantation claiming to have killed 75 PAVN and locating several supply caches.

During October, the 3rd Brigade formed a blocking force in the eastern Michelin Plantation while the 1st Infantry Division swept the Long Nguyen Secret Zone in Operation Shenandoah II.

Aftermath
Operation Diamond Head officially concluded on 31 October and PAVN losses were 136 killed whereas U.S. losses were 35 killed.

References

1967 in Vietnam
Battles involving the United States
Battles involving Vietnam
Battles and operations of the Vietnam War in 1967
Battles and operations of the Vietnam War
History of Tây Ninh Province